Goreme Col (‘Goremska Sedlovina’ \go-'rem-ska se-dlo-vi-'na\) is the col of elevation 2666 m linking Doyran Heights to the east to Mount Mohl on the northeast side of Craddock Massif in Sentinel Range, Ellsworth Mountains in Antarctica.  It is part of the glacial divide between Dater Glacier to the north and Thomas Glacier to the south.

The feature is named after the settlement of Goreme in Southwestern Bulgaria.

Location
US mapping in 1961, updated in 1988.

Maps
 Vinson Massif.  Scale 1:250 000 topographic map.  Reston, Virginia: US Geological Survey, 1988.
 Antarctic Digital Database (ADD). Scale 1:250000 topographic map of Antarctica. Scientific Committee on Antarctic Research (SCAR). Since 1993, regularly updated.

Notes

References
 Goreme Col. SCAR Composite Antarctic Gazetteer.
 Bulgarian Antarctic Gazetteer. Antarctic Place-names Commission. (details in Bulgarian, basic data in English)

External links
 Goreme Col. Copernix satellite image

Mountain passes of Ellsworth Land
Bulgaria and the Antarctic